Karl von Appen (12 May 1900, Düsseldorf - 22 August 1981, Berlin) was a German stage designer and member of the Association of Revolutionary Visual Artists.

Theatre
 1954: The Caucasian Chalk Circle by Bertolt Brecht; directed by Brecht at the Theater am Schiffbauerdamm in Berlin.
 1958: The Resistible Rise of Arturo Ui by Bertolt Brecht; directed by Peter Palitzsch in Stuttgart.

References

Sources
 Willett, John. 1967. The Theatre of Bertolt Brecht: A Study from Eight Aspects. Third rev. ed. London: Methuen, 1977. .

1900 births
1981 deaths
Artists from Düsseldorf
German scenic designers